Carl Wilhelm Kern (June 4, 1874 – August 19, 1945) was an American composer, pianist, theorist, and editor. Born in Schlitz, Hesse-Darmstadt, Germany, he studied in Europe before coming to the United States, where he taught at a number of different locations. It is estimated that he published over one thousand piano works; he also wrote songs, works for choir, operettas, and solos for organ.  He died in St. Louis, Missouri; his papers are held by Washington University in St. Louis.

References
 Papers at the Gaylord Music Library

External links 
 

1874 births
1945 deaths
American male composers
American composers
German emigrants to the United States